St Illtyd's Motte, also known as St Illtyd Castle Mound, is the remains of a motte-and-bailey castle in the village of Llanhilleth, Blaenau Gwent, Wales. It was probably destroyed by Llywelyn the Great in the early thirteenth century and not rebuilt. The remnants are a Scheduled Ancient Monument.

Notes

Motte-and-bailey castles
Buildings and structures in Blaenau Gwent